Isola is a town in Humphreys County, Mississippi, United States, on the banks of Lake Dawson. The population was 713 at the 2010 census, down from 768 at the 2000 census.

The name is derived from "isolation", due to the town's remote location when it was founded.

Geography
Isola is located in northern Humphreys County. It is bordered to the north by Sunflower County. U.S. Route 49W passes through the east side of the town, leading north  to Indianola and southeast  to Belzoni, the Humphreys County seat.

The southeast end of Lake Dawson, an old river channel, is near the northwest corner of the town. The lake leads northwest and connects via Pawson Bayou to the Big Sunflower River, a tributary of the Yazoo River.

Demographics

As of the census of 2000, there were 768 people, 279 households, and 191 families residing in the town. The population density was 1,040.5 people per square mile (400.7/km2). There were 307 housing units at an average density of 415.9 per square mile (160.2/km2). The racial makeup of the town was 63.67% African American, 32.68% White, 0.52% Native American, 2.73% from other races, and 0.39% from two or more races. Hispanic or Latino of any race were 3.12% of the population.

There were 279 households, out of which 33.7% had children under the age of 18 living with them, 38.4% were married couples living together, 25.1% had a female householder with no husband present, and 31.5% were non-families. 28.3% of all households were made up of individuals, and 13.6% had someone living alone who was 65 years of age or older. The average household size was 2.75 and the average family size was 3.37.

In the town, the population was spread out, with 31.6% under the age of 18, 10.3% from 18 to 24, 24.9% from 25 to 44, 19.0% from 45 to 64, and 14.2% who were 65 years of age or older. The median age was 32 years. For every 100 females, there were 87.3 males. For every 100 females age 18 and over, there were 79.2 males.

The median income for a household in the town was $25,063, and the median income for a family was $27,396. Males had a median income of $20,909 versus $17,639 for females. The per capita income for the town was $13,487. About 25.1% of families and 30.8% of the population were below the poverty line, including 48.0% of those under age 18 and 18.8% of those age 65 or over.

Education

The town is served by the Humphreys County School District. The children in Isola attend school in Belzoni.

Notable people
 Willie Bailey, member of the Mississippi House of Representatives
 Hank Cochran, country music singer and songwriter

References

Towns in Humphreys County, Mississippi
Towns in Mississippi